Alberstedt is a village and a former municipality in the Saalekreis district, Saxony-Anhalt, Germany.  It is situated between Halle (Saale) and Sangerhausen.  The earliest mention of Alberstedt appears in a 9th-century document of the Hersfeld Abbey. Since 1 January 2010, it is part of the municipality Farnstädt.

Former municipalities in Saxony-Anhalt
Saalekreis